Nazar (died 20 January 1991), was a Pakistani comedian and film actor. He debuted in films with a Punjabi language film Gul-Baloch which was released in 1944,In this film Famous Indian singer Mohammed Rafi was also introduced first time as playback singer. Nazar later played comedic role in Pakistan's first feature film Teri Yaad and Pakistan's first silver jubilee film Pheray (1949). As an actor, he appeared in many films and played lead role in film Judai (1950)‚ directed by Amin Malik.

During the early era of Pakistani films, he worked in Lollywood extensively alongside film actress Zeenat. In 1960, he was awarded the Nigar Award for best comedian for Humsafar (1960) film.

Filmography

Awards

Death
Nazar died on 20 January 1992.

References

External links 
 
 Filmography of actor Nazar on Complete Index To World Film (CITWF) website (Archived)

1992 deaths
Date of birth missing
Place of birth missing
Missing middle or first names
Pakistani male comedians
20th-century Pakistani male actors
Nigar Award winners